Paula de Eguiluz (fl. 1636) was a healer of African descent in present-day Santo Domingo. She was tried for witchcraft three times. She was a well-known health-care practitioner in one of the largest slave cities in the New World. She had an important impact on the community of African healers.

Early life 

De Eguiluz was born in Santo Domingo. Her mother, Guiomar, was an enslaved woman for a man named Diego de Leguizamón. De Eguiluz  lived in this house with her mother until her teenage years when she was bought by Íñigo de Otaza. She was enslaved to him for many years until she was sold to a man named Juan de Eguiluz in Havana.

Career 

When de Eguiluz  lived in Cartagena, there was a significant population of enslaved African women and African inhabitants in this area. Many people came and went since Cartagena was a port city. Owing to the number of people coming and going into the city, there was a substantial number of healers and ritual specialists. There was also a large amount of sickness and disease that would make its way through the city. Many of the healers tried to create cures for these diseases. However, Spaniards and Creoles saw these women as the cause of the sickness and disease. De Eguiluz  learned about remedies and rituals to help heal others.

De Eguiluz was accused and tried for witchcraft three separate times. These trials took place between 1623 and 1636.

The first trial 

The first time de Eguiluz  was accused of witchcraft was around 1624. Paula's Cuban neighbors provoked this first arrest with their shocking accusations against her, which included: killing a newborn by sucking on its navel, jumping out a window to avoid a blow from her master but suffering no injuries, practicing erotic magic, and having a pact with the devil as a member of a witches’ gathering. Showing her pride and personal sense of honor, Paula explained away these serious accusations as resulting from the jealousy of “people who hate her because her master loves her and they see her well-dressed.” Paula boasted accurately in terms of her wardrobe, which the Cuban Holy Office functionaries inventoried as including nine skirts, seven bodies, six shirts, and four headscarves. All of her clothing was new and expensive, far beyond expectations for an enslaved woman. She owned (and presumably wore, despite the tropical climate) heavy wool skirts lavishly dyed in blue, scarlet, dark green, and dark gold. She also had damask skirts, dyed blue or yellow, decorated in silver. Her bodices were equally luxurious, in bright combinations including blue with gold braid, green and scarlet with silver buttons, and white and yellow with silver braid.  

After three months and thirteen hearings Paula understood what the Inquisitors wanted to hear as her testimony: the story of the witches sabbath. The Inquisitors were not going to settle with any explanation she gave unless it was her confessing that she was a witch. She told a story about her witchcraft and her pact with the devil. None of it was true. It was all fiction, but it is what the Inquisitors wanted to hear. She was charged with witchcraft, had to be whipped around 200 times in public streets, and serve two years in the general hospital wearing the sambenito.

The second trial 
The second time de Eguiluz  was arrested was in 1632. There was suspicion that she had returned to witchcraft and made another pact with the devil. In the eight years between her first and second periods of imprisonment, even as she served her penance, Paula took advantage of her taste of freedom, earning her income as a healer and washerwoman, as well as taking part in passionate love affairs and socializing with other Afro-Caribbean women who dealt in erotic magic, powders, remedies, and possibly even witchcraft and occult-influenced sexuality. As was traditional in Cartagena and other cities in the Iberian peninsula and Spanish America, due to a popular interest in manipulating emotions and sexuality via potions and spells, women of a variety of social classes and nationalities gathered to confer, support each other's efforts in relationships with men, and buy and sell nostrums to help attract and keep men's interest and patronage.  Paula and all of her peers and clients regularly spoke of their magical practices as attempts at achieving “good love,” although the inquisitors described the relationships the women craved as “dishonest friendships.” Most of the experts in erotic magic in Cartagena were African-descent freedwomen and enslaved women, working in domestic servitude or in menial jobs such as washerwomen. These women practiced divination in an effort to learn about potential lovers who could give them gifts or alleviate their financial worries, however temporarily. Motivated by emotion cravings and sexual desires as well as financial expediency, they said binding spells and tied knots to keep these men with them. Invocations calling on souls in purgatory and hell demanded that the men would feel pain in their most sensitive and vital organs if they left the women. They also discussed “stupefying” men to make them more compliant. Paula taught her comadres incantations that could reignite the “flames of love” in a disaffected lover. She also knew how to make potions that would “get rid of a man’s love,” when he was no longer wanted.  

For her second trial, she had 21 hearings in which she developed a script of what the Inquisitors wanted to hear. By this time, however, she has made friends and connections within her local area. De Eguiluz  used these connections to try and help reduce her sentence. However, she also gave the Inquisitors a list of peoples names who may also be witches. This list had 21 women arrested due to witchcraft. For her testimony in this trial, she said what the Inquisitors wanted, but also included her experience with herbs, recipes and healing. She stressed the fact that she was trying to heal others, not harm, but was also saying that she did worship the devil. De Eguiluz  knew this was the only way the Inquisitors would listen to her.

The third trial 
In 1634, a prosecutor wanted to have de Eguiluz 's second trial reviewed. Some of the women that de Eguiluz  gave up in her testimony during her second trial were angry and wanted to testify against her. Five women said they confessed to participating in witchcraft because de Eguiluz  convinced them to. De Eguiluz  did not talk as much in this trial as she did in the others. She knew this trial was more serious, and she could potentially be executed. She emphasized her works as a healer. She even calls herself a curandera in this trial.

The Bishop 

One of the people Paula de Eguiluz tried to heal was Bishop Pérez de Lazarraga. He was a very wealthy man and had a competitive job in the New World. However even with this money, he chose to have de Eguiluz  try to heal his sickness. Peréz did not care about de Eguiluz's ideals or beliefs; he just wanted her to help him. He kept seeing her and having her try to heal him even though there were social issues with their relationship. This action shows how much he believed in her ability to help him. The couple just wanted to be free from all worries yet they were found and she died from a fire at stake.

References

Further reading 
 McKnight, Kathryn Joy., and Leo J. Garofalo. Afro-Latino Voices: Narratives from the Early Modern Ibero-Atlantic World, 1550–1812. Indianapolis: Hackett Pub., 2010.

Year of birth missing (living people)
Faith healers
People acquitted of witchcraft
People from Santo Domingo
Cuban slaves
17th-century slaves
People accused of witchcraft
American witchcraft